The 1972 IIHF European U19 Championship was the fifth playing of the IIHF European Junior Championships.

Group A 
Played in Boden, Luleå, and Skellefteå, Sweden, from March 26 to April 2, 1972

Norway was relegated to Group B for 1973.

Tournament Awards
Top Scorer: Håkan Dahllöf  (10 Points)
Top Goalie: Krister Sterner
Top Defenceman:Boris Verigin
Top Forward: Zdeněk Paulík

Group B
Played in Lyss, Switzerland from March 25–30, 1972.

First round 
Group 1

Group 2

Placing round 

Switzerland was promoted to Group A for 1973.

References

Complete results

Junior
IIHF European Junior Championship tournament
International ice hockey competitions hosted by Sweden
International ice hockey competitions hosted by Switzerland
U19
U19
March 1972 sports events in Europe
Sports competitions in Luleå
Sports competitions in Skellefteå
April 1972 sports events in Europe